Brennan Kapcheck is an American professional ice hockey defenseman who is currently playing for the Newfoundland Growlers in the ECHL while under contract to the Toronto Marlies in the American Hockey League (AHL). He was an All-American for American International.

Playing career

Junior
A diminutive defenseman from the Chicago-area, Kapcheck graduated from Culver Academies in 2015 and continued his playing career. He spent two seasons with the Aston Rebels, helping the team win their division in his first year and then capture the regular season championship in his second. Kapcheck's 42 points were 6th on the team and the Rebels marched all the wat to the NAHL finals but were swept 0–3. He was the named as the East Division Defenseman of the Year and named to the All-Division and All-League teams.

College
With his junior eligibility exhausted, Kapcheck transitioned to college hockey. He began attending American International College in 2017, joining a program that had traditionally been a doormat, but the hiring of Eric Lang a year earlier presaged a possible change. Kapcheck got off to a fantastic start to his college career, being named Atlantic Hockey rookie of the month for October and was eventually awarded the league's Rookie of the Year. That season, the Yellow Jackets won 15 games, the most they had earned since 1993 (when they played in Division III) and won their first playoff round in eleven years. Kapcheck was a semifinalist for the Walter Brown Award, given to the best American player in New England and was nominated for the Hobey Baker Award (though he didn't make the final 10).

As a sophomore, Kapcheck's numbers remained flat but both he and the team saw vast improvements overall. AIC won its first ever regular season championship and also captured the Atlantic Hockey Tournament for the first time. He was named first team all-conference for the first of three consecutive seasons and scored the winning goal in American International's first NCAA Tournament game. His junior season saw more of the same as the Yellow Jackets were the class of Atlantic Hockey and ran away with the regular season title. As the team was preparing to begin their postseason run, COVID-19 hit and the end of the college hockey season was cancelled.

The start to the following season was delayed but Kapcheck's team was still a force in Atlantic Hockey. AIC lost just one conference game all season, capturing both the regular and post season championships, but the team was hamstrung by COVID in the second half of the year. Cancellations limited the Yellow Jackets to just 19 games, and American International looked out of sorts in their NCAA Tournament loss. Despite the unfortunate end, Kapcheck was regarded as one of the best defenseman in college hockey, winning the East pod POY and became just the second player in program history to named as an All-American.

Despite having a year of eligibility remaining, Kapcheck signed a professional contract after the season with the Toronto Marlies.

Career statistics

Awards and honors

References

External links
 

1996 births
AHCA Division I men's ice hockey All-Americans
American men's ice hockey defensemen
American International Yellow Jackets men's ice hockey players
Ice hockey players from Illinois
Living people
People from Mount Prospect, Illinois
Newfoundland Growlers players
Toronto Marlies players